Mórkowo  is a village in the administrative district of Gmina Lipno, within Leszno County, Greater Poland Voivodeship, in west-central Poland.

Located in the village's former estate house is the novitiate of the Society of Christ.

References

Villages in Leszno County